Jay Lawrence McNeil Miron (born October 3, 1970) is a Canadian retired BMX athlete and former owner of MacNeil Bikes. He competed in several X-Games competitions since 1995, compiling nine medals, including the first ever X Games gold medal for Bike Dirt. In addition, Miron is credited with inventing more than 30 tricks, including the double back flip and the 540 tailwhip. During his 17 year long professional career, Miron won six world championship titles. He retired from professional BMX riding in 2005. He sold MacNeil Bikes in 2010 and left the bicycle industry.

In February 2017, Miron started an Instagram account announcing he was back in the world. He now designs and builds bespoke furniture from his woodworking studio in Vancouver, Canada.

References

External links
 MacNeil BMX Company
 Jay Miron Furniture

1970 births
BMX riders
Canadian male cyclists
Living people
Sportspeople from Thunder Bay
X Games athletes